ConcertWare is a music composition computer program made by Chad Mitchell of Great Wave Software for the classic Mac OS in 1984. Later versions were published by Jump! Software Inc. It was the first music program for the Apple Macintosh that printed music from a graphics screen. It included MIDI keyboard capabilities with an on-screen keyboard. The 1994 Jump! Software version of Concertware 1.5 was Mac/Win. In January 2000 Jump! Music discontinued support for all Macintosh products and by 2001 the company website was no longer in service.

References 

Scorewriters
Macintosh-only software